David Drysdale (Dunfermline, 28 December 1877  – Edinburgh, 1946 ) was a Scottish mathematician.

References

1877 births
1946 deaths
Scottish mathematicians
19th-century British mathematicians
20th-century British mathematicians
Alumni of the University of Edinburgh
Scottish scholars and academics
People from Dunfermline